Glenville is a neighborhood and census-designated place in the town of Greenwich in Fairfield County, Connecticut, United States. As of the 2010 census, it had a population of 2,327. It is located in the western part of Greenwich at the falls of the Byram River, which provided waterpower when this was a mill village. The area is home to Glenville Elementary school, Western Civic Center and a volunteer fire station, the Glenville Fire Department.

The town of Greenwich is one political and taxing body, but consists of several distinct sections or neighborhoods, such as Banksville, Byram, Cos Cob, Glenville, Mianus,  Old Greenwich, Riverside and Greenwich (sometimes referred to as central, or downtown, Greenwich). Of these neighborhoods, three (Cos Cob, Old Greenwich, and Riverside) have separate postal names and ZIP codes.

Historic district

The original settlement of Glenville, which was formerly known as "Sherwood's Bridge", was listed on the National Register of Historic Places in 2007 as the Glenville Historic District. It "is also historically significant as one of the town's major staging areas of immigrants, predominantly Irish in the 19th century and Polish in the 20th century" and remains "the primary settlement of Poles in the town". Further, "[t]he district is architecturally significant because it contains two elaborate examples of mill construction, designed in the Romanesque Revival and a transitional Stick-style/Queen Anne; an excellent example of a Georgian Revival school; and notable examples of domestic and commercial architecture, including a Queen Anne mansion and an Italianate store building."

Geography 

Attractions 

The center of Glenville boasts a variety of attractions. Notably, the Bendheim Western Greenwich Civic Center is located in the heart of the neighborhood. Next to the Civic Center is a baseball diamond and playground. There is a large hill above the baseball field that is a popular place for children to sled in the wintertime.

In addition to the Civic Center, Glenville is home to a number of popular restaurants and stores. The neighborhood has a small Stop & Shop supermarket. Glenville Pizza, GVille Deli and Rebeccas are three of the most frequently visited dining options in Glenville.

References

Neighborhoods in Connecticut
Greenwich, Connecticut
Census-designated places in Fairfield County, Connecticut
Census-designated places in Connecticut